Aetheolaena mochensis is a species of flowering plant in the family Asteraceae. It is found only in Ecuador. It is threatened by habitat loss.

References

mochensis
Flora of Ecuador
Endangered plants
Taxonomy articles created by Polbot